Lee Zahler (August 14, 1893 – February 21, 1947) was an American composer and musical director of films, starting in the 1920s and well into the 1940s.

During his career, he composed the music to the 1943 Batman and The Phantom serials for Columbia studios. Zahler directed the music for all Columbia Pictures productions between 1938 and 1947, except for Brenda Starr Reporter in 1945, which was conducted by Edward J. Kay.

Selected filmography

 Dark Skies (1929)
 Air Eagles (1931)
 Defenders of the Law (1931)
 Love Bound (1932)
Behind Jury Doors (1932)
 Cannonball Express (1932)
 Dance Girl Dance  (1933)
 The Flaming Signal (1933)
 Revenge at Monte Carlo (1933)
Secret Sinners (1933)
 The Woman Who Dared (1933)
 Cheating Blondes (1933)
 The Fugitive (1933)
 The Trail Beyond (1934) 
 Frontier Days (1934)
 Ticket to a Crime (1934)
 When Lightning Strikes (1934)
 The Perfect Clue (1935)
 Western Courage (1935)
 Mutiny Ahead (1935)
 Skybound (1935)
 The Last of the Clintons (1935)
 Rio Grande Ranger (1936)
 Idaho Kid (1936)
 The Speed Reporter (1936)
 The Lion's Den (1936)
 The Fugitive Sheriff (1936)
 Desert Justice (1936)
 Under Suspicion (1937)
 Heroes of the Alamo  (1937)
 Reformatory (1938)
 The Strange Case of Dr. Meade (1938)
 Whispering Enemies (1939)
 Frontiers of '49 (1939)
 Passport to Alcatraz (1940)
 Fugitive from a Prison Camp (1940)
 The Great Swindle (1941)
 Girls' Town (1942)
 The Underdog (1943)
 The Lady Confesses (1945)
 Outlaws of the Plains (1946)

References

External links

The Music of Lee Zahler{http://www.westernclippings.com/sr/serialreport_2020_116.shtml}

1893 births
1947 deaths
Musicians from New York City
American male composers
20th-century American composers
Burials at Forest Lawn Memorial Park (Glendale)
20th-century American male musicians